Charles Nelson Skinner (March 12, 1833 – September 22, 1910) was a Canadian lawyer, judge, and politician.

Born in Saint John, New Brunswick, the son of Samuel and Phoebe S. (Golding) Skinner, Skinner was educated at the public and Grammar schools of Saint John. After leaving school, he prepared for the legal profession. He studied law in the office of C. W. Stockton, and was admitted to the Bar, Trinity term, 1860. He commenced to practice his profession in partnership with George G. Gilbert, under the firm name of Gilbert & Skinner. This partnership lasted about four years, when he began practice in his own name, and so continued until January 1894, when he took his two sons into partnership, Charles S. and Sherwood Skinner, the firm name being C. N. Skinner & Sons.

He was a member of the New Brunswick Legislature from 1862 to 1868 and was Solicitor General from 1865 to 1868. From 1868 to 1885, he was a judge of probate. In 1887, he was elected to the House of Commons of Canada for the City and County of St. John. He was also re-elected for the same constituency in 1891, but resigned his seat in 1892 when he was re-appointed a judge.

He was a member of the Orange Order and of the Independent Order of Odd Fellows. He was married to Eliza J. McLaughlin and had five sons and three daughters.

Electoral record

External links

This article incorporates text from The Canadian album: men of Canada, Vol. 4, a publication now in the public domain.

1833 births
1910 deaths
Liberal Party of Canada MPs
Members of the House of Commons of Canada from New Brunswick
Lawyers in New Brunswick
Members of the Legislative Assembly of New Brunswick
Colony of New Brunswick people
Judges in New Brunswick